Lower Burrell is a city in northern Westmoreland County, Pennsylvania, United States, along the Allegheny River. Located approximately 18 miles northeast of downtown Pittsburgh, it is part of the Pittsburgh metropolitan area. The population was 11,758 at the 2020 census.

History 
The region in which Lower Burrell is located was originally part of the hunting reserves of the Iroquois. Permanent European settlement began in the 1760s, and Westmoreland County was created in 1773. In 1852, due to an increase in population in the area, Burrell Township was carved out of Allegheny Township on court order of Judge Jeremiah Murry Burrell. In 1879 Burrell Township was divided into two separate townships, Lower Burrell and Upper Burrell. The present-day cities of New Kensington and Arnold were once part of Lower Burrell Township. In the years that followed, Lower Burrell transformed from a quiet, rural farm community to a residential and commercial area while Upper Burrell stayed primarily rural. Upper Burrell Township is still somewhat rural, though it has experienced some suburban growth and sprawl in recent years. 

In 1959, in the midst of the growth of their community, township residents voted to make Lower Burrell a third class city. Lower Burrell continued to grow substantially until the 1980s. Like many communities in Western Pennsylvania, Lower Burrell suffered economic and population stagnation with the collapse of local heavy industry. Since the early 1990s, Lower Burrell experienced slight growth, though one of its only large shopping centers remains mostly vacant. Preliminary data from the 2010 census shows that Lower Burrell has lost about 5 percent of its population since 2000.

The Allegheny River Lock and Dam No. 4 was listed on the National Register of Historic Places in 2000.

Geography
Lower Burrell is located at  (40.583966, -79.721948).

Informally, the city is divided into different neighborhoods and areas including Bon Air, Braeburn, Braeburn Heights, Central City, Edgecliff, Gladeview, Indian Fields I & II and Kinloch. Lower Burrell's central Business District overlaps Bon Air-Central City-Gladeview neighborhoods.

Lower Burrell is located in the Appalachian Plateau, the western portion of the Appalachian Mountain range. The landscape varies greatly, with large swaths of flat land (typically in Bon Air, Central City and Gladeview) to areas with gentle slopes, and even steep cliffs and hillsides in certain areas. The city is bounded on the north and southwestern corner by the Allegheny River.

Streams

 Pucketa Creek joins the Allegheny River where the creek forms the boundary between both the city of Lower Burrell and the borough of Plum.
 Little Pucketa Creek joins Pucketa Creek at Lower Burrell.
 Chartiers Run joins the Allegheny River at Lower Burrell.

Demographics

As of the census of 2000, there were 12,608 people, 5,133 households, and 3,654 families residing in the city. The population density was 1,091.8 people per square mile (421.5/km2). There were 5,324 housing units at an average density of 461.0 per square mile (178.0/km2). The racial makeup of the city was 97.95% White, 0.93% African American, 0.03% Native American, 0.36% Asian, 0.02% Pacific Islander, 0.10% from other races, and 0.62% from two or more races. Hispanic or Latino of any race were 0.44% of the population.

There were 5,133 households, out of which 27.6% had children under the age of 18 living with them, 58.6% were married couples living together, 9.4% had a female householder with no husband present, and 28.8% were non-families. 25.8% of all households were made up of individuals, and 15.6% had someone living alone who was 65 years of age or older. The average household size was 2.41 and the average family size was 2.90.

In the city, the population was spread out, with 21.5% under the age of 18, 5.7% from 18 to 24, 25.8% from 25 to 44, 24.3% from 45 to 64, and 22.7% who were 65 years of age or older. The median age was 43 years. For every 100 females, there were 89.0 males. For every 100 females age 18 and over, there were 86.4 males.

The median income for a household in the city was $41,000, and the median income for a family was $50,036. Males had a median income of $38,900 versus $25,706 for females. The per capita income for the city was $20,143. About 4.3% of families and 6.5% of the population were below the poverty line, including 8.0% of those under age 18 and 3.3% of those age 65 or over.

Government

Officials 
Lower Burrell is a third class city in the Commonwealth of Pennsylvania. It has a commission form of government where the mayor of the city only has one vote and no veto power. The mayor heads the City's Department of Public Affairs, which oversees the Lower Burrell Police Department, City Clerk, Solicitor, Health Department, Ordinance Officer, Animal Control Officer, Emergency Management Department, Auxiliary Police, Fire Code Enforcement Officer and School Crossing Guards. In addition to the mayor, Lower Burrell has four councilmen. Each councilman heads a different department including the Department of Accounts and Finance, Department of Parks and Public Property, Department of Public Safety and the Department of Streets and Improvements. The current mayor is John Andrejcik, a Democrat elected in 2019 and a Veteran of the U.S. Navy.

Police department 

The Lower Burrell Police Department is staffed by 17 full-time police officers, including a Chief of Police and two divisions made up of the Detective and Patrol/Traffic department. The department has a new K-9 officer, Patrolman Rodgers, and his K-9 partner, Buc.

Fire and ambulance services 

Lower Burrell is served by two volunteer fire companies. Lower Burrell Fire Company 1 is located in the Kinloch section of the city. Lower Burrell Fire Company 3 serves the Bon Air, Central City and Gladeview neighborhoods, the business district, Braeburn and Braeburn Heights. Fire Company 4 used to serve the Braeburn and Braeburn Heights areas in the city. Fire Company 2, was formerly located in Braeburn and merged into Company 4 in 2005. Company 4, in turn, was closed in 2009. Lower Burrell's EMS coverage is provided by Company 3. The city has approximately 100 volunteer firefighters.

Education 
Lower Burrell and Upper Burrell Township are jointly served by the Burrell School District. The district consists of Bon Air (K-3rd) and Stewart elementary schools (4th-5th), the Charles A. Huston Middle School, and Burrell High School.

On a post-secondary level, Lower Burrell was once home to Newport Business Institute and Oakbridge Academy of Arts, both located in the Kinloch neighborhood. The for-profit schools shut down in the middle of a school day on December 16, 2013. Penn State New Kensington is located in nearby Upper Burrell Township and a branch campus of Westmoreland County Community College is in neighboring New Kensington.

Notable people 

 Jason Altmire, former member of the U.S. House of Representatives
 Pete Babando, NHL player for Detroit Red Wings and winner of the 1950 Stanley Cup
Shane Black, film director, producer, screenwriter and actor
 Tom Brown, NFL running back for the Miami Dolphins
Linda Drane Burdick, prosecutor known for State of Florida vs. Casey Anthony
Stefan Lundberg, former soccer player for the Pittsburgh Riverhounds
 Leonard R. Olijar, accountant and director of the Bureau of Engraving and Printing
 Tom Squitieri, journalist and former foreign correspondent for USA Today

References

External links
City of Lower Burrell official website

Cities in Pennsylvania
Cities in Westmoreland County, Pennsylvania
Populated places established in 1852
Pittsburgh metropolitan area
1852 establishments in Pennsylvania